Karis Priester (29 December 1941 – 25 April 2020) was a German historian and political scientist.

Biography
Priester studied romance languages, history, philosophy, and political science at the University of Cologne, Aix-Marseille University, the Free University of Berlin, and the University of Florence. She obtained her doctorate in history and her habilitation in political science from the University of Marburg with a thesis on Italian Marxism. After teaching at the University of Giessen and RWTH Aachen University, she was a professor of political sociology at the University of Münster starting in 1980. She retired in February 2007. After her retirement, she studied populism and right-wing extremism.

Karis Priester died in Münster on 25 April 2020 at the age of 78.

Works
Der italienische Faschismus. Ökonomische und ideologische Grundlagen (1972)
Studien zur Staatstheorie des italienischen Marxismus: Gramsci und Della Volpe (1981)
Hat der Eurokommunismus eine Zukunft? Perspektiven und Grenzen des Systemwandels in Westeuropa (1982)
Rassismus und kulturelle Differenz (1997)
Mythos Tod. Tod und Todeserleben in der modernen Literatur (2001)
Mary Shelley. Die Frau, die Frankenstein erfand. Eine Biografie (2001)
Mary Wollstonecraft. Ein Leben für die Frauenrechte (2002)
Rassismus. Eine Sozialgeschichte (2003)
Geschichte der Langobarden. Gesellschaft – Kultur – Alltagsleben (2004)
Populismus. Historische und aktuelle Erscheinungsformen (2007)
Rechter und linker Populismus: Annäherung an ein Chamäleon (2012)
Das Phänomen des Berlusconismus (2013)
Mystik und Politik. Ernesto Laclau, Chantal Mouffe und die radikale Demokratie (2014)
Warum Europäer in den Heiligen Krieg ziehen. Der Dschihadismus als rechtsradikale Jugendbewegung (2017)
Rechtspopulismus – ein umstrittenes theoretisches und politisches Phänomen (2017)

References

1941_births 
2020_deaths 
20th-century German historians
German_political_scientists
Women political scientists
21st-century German historians